Berk Cankat (born 9 May 1984) is a Turkish actor and graphic designer.

Biography 
Cankart was born on 9 May 1984 in Ankara to family of Circassian origin.

He was never interested in acting in college. After graduating from university, he came to Istanbul to work as a graphic designer with his close friend. He decided to become an actor after coming to Istanbul. He studied acting at the Academy 35 Buçuk Sanat Evi and began his professional career in theater. In 2011, he starred in the plays The Seagull written by Anton Chekhov and Barut Kıvısı written by Dejan Dukovski, followed by the theater play Merhaba Efendim written by Muzaffer İzgü in 2012. He also worked as an assistant to Civan Canova on the play Kızıl Ötesi Aydınlık, and to Vahide Perçin on Otobüs.

His first television experience was with Sana Bir Sır Vereceğim on Fox TV. In this series, he portrayed the character of "Savaş" which had fantastic powers and controlled minds with his gaze. After making a name for himself, he joined the Medcezir''' series as a guest actor and brought the character of "Cem" to life. After becoming well-known in Turkey, in summer 2014 he got a role on Star TV's series Güzel Köylü playing the character of "Cemal". Cankat shared the leading role with Gizem Karaca, Mehmet Ali Nuroğlu and Ahmet Mümtaz Taylan. However, the series ended on 17 June 2015. In November 2015, he was cast as "İskender (Alex)" on the historic series Muhteşem Yüzyıl: Kösem, produced by Tims Productions for Star TV. In January 2016, Cankat won an Elle Style Awards as Actor of the Year. In 2017, he was cast in a leading role on Yıldızlar Şahidim'' opposite Özge Gürel.

Theater

Filmography

References

External links

1984 births
Living people
Turkish male television actors
Turkish male stage actors
Turkish graphic designers
Male actors from Ankara
Turkish people of Circassian descent